"...After the Phantoms of Your Former Self" is the second episode of the American gothic horror television series Interview with the Vampire, an adaptation of Anne Rice's novel of the same name. Written by Jonathan Ceniceroz and Dave Harris and directed by executive producer Alan Taylor, the episode first aired on October 9, 2022, on AMC.

The plot follows Daniel Molloy's second interview session with vampire Louis de Pointe du Lac. Louis' life story as a vampire continues directly after the end of the previous episode, with him now trying to adapt to his new life as a vampire and learn how to use the vampire ability to read people's minds. The episode received critical acclaim, with praise going towards the directing, writing, cinematography, humor, and performances of Anderson and Reid.

Plot 
In the present, Louis (Jacob Anderson) and Molloy (Eric Bogosian) begin the second session of their interview while having dinner together. During dinner, Louis confesses that he no longer preys on people and that his last victim was in 2000.

Louis' story continues with Lestat (Sam Reid) disposing of the priests that he killed in the previous episode in the church graveyard. Louis follows him while stumbling around as his transformation into a vampire is progressing. Louis then notices drops of blood on the ground from one of the corpses and tries to taste it but is stopped by Lestat. He explains that drinking blood from a dead body can kill vampires.

Lestat then helps Louis find his first prey at a bar and they then find a man, whom they later bring to Lestat's house. Upon arrival, Louis devours the man while Lestat teaches him the right way to suck the blood through the neck. Afterwards, Louis is overwhelmed with guilt, so he decides to go home. On the way home, the sunlight shines on him and burns his skin. In pain, he runs back to Lestat's house. Lestat then shows Louis his bedroom and invites Louis to sleep on top of him in his coffin.

The following night, Lestat teaches Louis to listen to people's heartbeats and thoughts. Louis asks Lestat to read his mind, and Lestat replies that he can no longer do it on Louis as it is part of the sacrifice after turning him into a vampire. They then visit Du Lac's family house where Louis reunites with his mother (Rae Dawn Chong) and sister, Grace (Kalyne Coleman). He practices his abilities on them and, while hugging Grace, he feels two other heartbeats, sensing that she is pregnant, and tells her that she is carrying twins. Later, it is shown that Louis now has his own coffin. Before sleep, Louis tells Lestat that he wants to buy the Fair Play Saloon and asks Lestat to support him, to which he agrees.

Five years later, Louis, who has been away from his family since his last visit, pays his family a visit and learns that, in addition to the twins, Grace has given birth to another baby. When Grace leaves the room to care for her other children in another room, she asks Louis to hold the baby. Louis is tempted to eat the baby, but he chooses to go home without saying goodbye and leaves the baby on the floor. At Lestat's house, Louis tells him about the guilt and shame for nearly eating his own nephew.

Later, the two go out to see an opera show. During the performance, Lestat is unimpressed by the lead tenor's performance and ends up feeling unamused. After the performance, Lestat talks to and invites the tenor to his house. Lestat then kills him, while Louis watches in horror. However, Louis eventually decides to join Lestat to drink his blood.

Production

Writing 
"...After the Phantoms of Your Former Self" was written by series writers Jonathan Ceniceroz and Dave Harris.

Filming 
On July 19, 2021, Alan Taylor was announced to direct the first two episodes of the first season. David Tattersall worked as the cinematographer of the episode. The first season's principal photography took place in New Orleans, from November 8, 2021, until May 18, 2022.

Release 
"...After the Phantoms of Your Former Self" aired on AMC, on October 9, 2022, but was released a week earlier on the network's streaming service AMC+.

Reception

Ratings 
On linear television, an estimated 0.525 million viewers watched "...After the Phantoms of Your Former Self" during its first broadcast on AMC, with a 0.09 ratings share. This was a decrease from the previous episode, which was watched by 0.622 million viewers with a 0.15 ratings share.

Critical reception 

The episode was met with critical acclaim. On the review aggregator Rotten Tomatoes, it holds an approval rating of 100% based on six reviews, with an average rating of 8.8/10.

It received a rating of 5/5 stars from Tony Sokol of Den of Geek, who praised the performances of Anderson and Reid; 4.7/5 stars from Ashley Bissette Sumerel of Tell-Tale TV, writing that, "'After the Phantoms of Your Former Self' is even more breathtaking than the first episode. It continues to capture the spirit of Anne Rice's works in a way that's thought-provoking and timely. [...] The series continues to be so much better than I could have hoped for, and it has me falling in love with Anne Rice's works in a whole new way"; 4.5/5 stars from Whitney Evans of TV Fanatic, who singled out the cinematography and performances of Anderson and Reid as the highlights of the episode, and wrote, "It's safe to say the first episode wasn't a fluke, as the second installment is excellent"; 4/5 stars from Kathleen Walsh of Vulture; and 3/5 stars from Greg Wheeler of The Review Geek, who noted the episode's "slower" pace, in comparison to the first, and how it "[did not have] much in the way of plot progression". Nonetheless, he still appreciated it as it "sets things up for a much more dramatic chapter to come next week".

Concluding his review, Sean T. Collins of Decider said, "This is heady, funny, nasty, sexy, cutting, opulent stuff — again, exactly what you'd want from an Anne Rice adaptation and more. While it often takes itself deadly seriously, as the melodramatic material demands, it's also shot through with that strain of actually funny comedy, letting just a little bit of daylight in to enhance the shadows. An extraordinary balancing act and, I think, an extraordinary show." Collins also praised the writing and directing work of the episode. Sara Netzley of Entertainment Weekly wrote, "Dare I say this episode was even better than the pilot? We get more layers of Lestat tonight, more of his humor and savagery, and Jacob Anderson's range continues to be extraordinary." In addition, several critics pointed out the humor as one of the episode's highlights.

References

External links 
 

2022 American television episodes
American LGBT-related television episodes
Television episodes about vampires